Lunkaransar Assembly constituency is one of constituencies of Rajasthan Legislative Assembly in the Bikaner (Lok Sabha constituency).

Lunkaransar Constituency covers all voters from Lunkaransar tehsil and parts of Bikaner tehsil, which include ILRC Jamsar, ILRC Napasar and Ridmalsar Purohitan of ILRC Bikaner.

References

See also 
 Member of the Legislative Assembly (India)

Bikaner district
Assembly constituencies of Rajasthan